Janice Okoh is a British playwright and screenwriter.

Early life
Okoh is from Lewisham. Before becoming a playwright, she worked as a teacher.

Career
Her first play, Egusi Soup was produced in 2012 by Menagerie Theatre/Soho Theatre. In 2011 Okoh won the Bruntwood Prize for Playwriting for her play Three Birds (which would be produced in 2013), which she entered under a pseudonym Ebenezer Foot. The play was also short-listed for the Verity Bargate Award and the Alfred Fagon Award.

Okoh's play The Gift (2020) tells the story of the Egbado princess Sarah Bonetta who was given to Queen Victoria as a gift, and raised as her god-daughter. The play opened at the Belgrade Theatre, Coventry in January 2020 before moving on to the Theatre Royal Stratford East. It was a finalist for the Susan Smith Blackburn Prize. She has also written for radio, including an adaptation of Malorie Blackman’s Noughts & Crosses.

Okoh has also written for television, contributing episodes of Doctors, Hetty Feather and On the Edge . She joined the writing team for series 2 of ITV's Sanditon.

Works

Stage plays
 Top Brass. Theatre 503, 2010.
 Egusi Soup. Nick Hern, 2012.
 Three Birds, 2013.
 The Gift, 2020.

Radio plays
 Carnival. Aired on BBC Radio R, 2010.
 Reunion. Aired on BBC Radio 4 Extra, 2011.
 Noughts & Cross. Aired on BBC Radio 4, 2014.
 Silk: The Clerks Room. Aired on BBC Radio 4, 2014.
 The Awakening. Aired on BBC Radio 4, 2014.
 The Heart of a Woman. Aired on BBC Radio 4, 2015.
 Red Earth, Red Sky. Aired on BBC Radio 4. 2019.
 Half of a Yellow Sun. Aired on BBC Radio 4, 2020.
 Cane. Aired on BBC Radio 4, 2020.

References

External links
 

Year of birth missing (living people)
Living people
21st-century British women writers
21st-century British dramatists and playwrights
British women screenwriters
British women dramatists and playwrights
Women soap opera writers
British women television writers